An aerial torpedo (also known as an airborne torpedo or air-dropped torpedo) is a torpedo launched from a torpedo bomber aircraft into the water, after which the weapon propels itself to the target.

First used in World War I, air-dropped torpedoes were used extensively in World War II, and remain in limited use. Aerial torpedoes are generally smaller and lighter than submarine- and surface-launched torpedoes.

History

Origins 

The idea of dropping lightweight torpedoes from aircraft was conceived in the early 1910s by Bradley A. Fiske, an officer in the United States Navy. A patent for this was awarded in 1912. Fiske worked out the mechanics of carrying and releasing the aerial torpedo from a bomber, and defined tactics that included a night-time approach so that the target ship would be less able to defend itself. Fiske imagined the notional torpedo bomber would descend rapidly in a sharp spiral to evade enemy guns, then at an altitude of about  would level off long enough to line up with the torpedo's intended path. In 1915, Fiske proposed attacking enemy fleets within their own harbors using this method, if there was enough water (depth and expanse) for the torpedo to run. However, the United States Congress appropriated no funds for aerial torpedo research until 1917 when the U.S. entered into direct action in World War I. The U.S. would not have special-purpose torpedo planes until 1921.

First torpedo aircraft 

Meanwhile, the Royal Naval Air Service (RNAS) began actively experimenting with this possibility. The first successful aerial torpedo drop was unofficially performed by the later RFC pilot Charles Gordon Bell on 27 July 1914 - dropping a Whitehead torpedo from a Short S.64 seaplane. Gordon Bell was followed the next day by RNAS pilot Arthur Longmore, when officially testing an aerial torpedo. The success of these experiments led to the construction of the first purpose-built operational torpedo aircraft, the Short Type 184, built from 1915.

An order for ten aircraft was placed, and 936 aircraft were built by ten different British aircraft companies during the First World War. The two prototype aircraft were embarked upon HMS Ben-my-Chree, which sailed for the Aegean on 21 March 1915 to take part in the Gallipoli campaign.

Around the same time of the Royal Navy experiments, in Italy Captain Alessandro Guidoni of the Regia Marina was conducting similar trials since 1913, with the help of inventor Raúl Pateras Pescara, and in February 1914 successfully dropped an 800 lb torpedo, leading to disputes over which country first used an aerial torpedo.

First World War 

In November 1914, Germans were reportedly experimenting at Lake Constance with the tactic of dropping torpedoes from a Zeppelin. In December 1914, Squadron Commander Cecil L'Estrange Malone commented following his participation in the Cuxhaven Raid that "One can well imagine what might have been done had our seaplanes, or those which were sent out to attack us, carried torpedoes or light guns."

On 12 August 1915 a Short Type 184, piloted by Flight Commander Charles Edmonds, was the first aircraft in the world to attack an enemy ship with an air-launched torpedo.

Five days later, a Turkish steamship was sunk by a torpedo aimed again by Edmonds. His formation mate, Flight Lieutenant G. B. Dacre, sank a Turkish tugboat after being forced to land on the water with engine trouble. Dacre taxied toward the tugboat, released his torpedo and was then able to take off and return to Ben-My-Chree. A limitation to using the Short more widely as a torpedo bomber was that it could only take off carrying a torpedo in conditions of perfect flying weather and calm seas, and, with that load, could only fly for a little more than 45 minutes before running out of fuel.

On May 1, 1917, a German seaplane loosed a torpedo and sank the  British steamship Gena off Suffolk. A second German seaplane was downed by gunfire from the sinking Gena. German torpedo bomber squadrons were subsequently assembled at Ostend and Zeebrugge for further action in the North Sea. Later in 1917, the U.S. Navy began to perform trials using a  dummy torpedo that, in the first test, porpoised from the water back into the air and almost hit the aircraft that dropped it. Several British torpedo bombers were built, including the Sopwith Cuckoo, the Short Shirl and the Blackburn Blackburd, but a squadron was assembled so late in the war that it achieved no successes.

Interwar years 

The United States bought its first 10 torpedo bombers in 1921, variants of the Martin MB-1. The squadron of U.S. Navy and Marine fliers was based at Naval Weapons Station Yorktown. General Billy Mitchell suggested arming the torpedo bombers with live warheads as part of Project B (the anti-ship bombing demonstration) but the Navy was only curious about aerial bomb damage effects. Instead, a trial using dummy heads on the torpedoes was carried out against a foursome of battleships steaming at 17 knots. The torpedo bombers scored well.

In 1936, the torpedo was given wooden attachments to the tail, nicknamed the Kyoban, to increase its aerodynamic qualities—these attachments were shed upon hitting the water. As well, the Japanese Navy developed night attack and massed day attack doctrine, and coordinated aerial torpedo attacks between land- and carrier-based torpedo bombers.

The Japanese divided their bomber squadrons into two groups so they could attack an enemy battleship from both frontal quarters and make it difficult for the target to avoid the torpedoes by maneuvering, and more difficult for it to direct anti-aircraft fire at the bombers. Even so, Japanese tactical experts predicted that, against a battleship, the attacking force would score hits at only one-third the rate achieved during peacetime exercises.

Beginning in 1925, the United States began designing a special torpedo for purely aerial operations. The project was discontinued and revived several times, and finally resulted in the Mark 13 torpedo, which went into service in 1935. The Mark 13 differed from aerial torpedoes used by other nations in that it was wider and shorter. It was slower than its competitors but it had longer range. The weapon was released by an aircraft traveling lower and slower ( high,  than its Japanese contemporary.

World War II 

On the night of November 11–12, 1940, Fairey Swordfish biplane torpedo bombers of the British Fleet Air Arm sank three Italian battleships at the Battle of Taranto using a combination of torpedoes and bombs. In the course of the chase of the German battleship Bismarck, torpedo strikes were attempted in very bad seas, and one of these damaged her rudder allowing the British fleet to catch her.

German aerial torpedo development lagged behind other belligerents—a continuation of neglect of the category during the 1930s. At the beginning of World War II, Germany was making only five aerial torpedoes per month, and half were failing in air-drop exercises. Instead, Italian aerial torpedoes made by Fiume were purchased, with 1,000 eventually delivered.

In August 1941, Japanese aviators were practicing dropping torpedoes in the shallow waters of Kagoshima Bay, testing improvements in the Type 91 torpedo and developing tactics for the attack of ships in harbor. They discovered that the Nakajima B5N torpedo bomber could fly , somewhat faster than expected, without the torpedoes striking the bottom of the bay  down. On December 7, 1941, the leading wave—40 B5Ns—used the tactic to score more than 15 hits during the attack on Pearl Harbor.

In April 1942, Adolf Hitler made the production of aerial torpedoes a German priority, and the Luftwaffe took the task over from the Kriegsmarine. The quantity of available aerial torpedoes outstripped usage within a year, and an excess of aerial torpedoes was on hand at the end of the war. From 1942 to late 1944, about 4,000 aerial torpedoes were used, but some 10,000 were manufactured during the whole war. Torpedo bombers were modified Heinkel He 111 and Junkers Ju 88 aircraft, but the Focke-Wulf Fw 190 fighter aircraft was successfully tested as a delivery system. Deficiencies in German-designed torpedoes after the capitulation of Italy in September 1943 were addressed just over a year before, through the yanagi visit of Japanese submarine I-30 in August 1942, to supply the Wehrmacht with the Type 91 torpedo's technology and blueprints, to be made in Germany itself as the Lufttorpedo LT 850.

Like the Japanese Type 91, the Mark 13 was subsequently fitted with a wooden nose covering and a wooden tail ring, both of which sheared off when it struck the water. The wooden shrouds slowed it and helped it retain its targeting direction through the duration of the air drop.

In 1941, development began in the United States on the FIDO, an electric-powered air-dropped acoustic homing torpedo intended for anti-submarine use. In the United Kingdom, the standard airborne torpedo was strengthened for higher aircraft speeds to become the Mark XV, followed by the Mark XVII.

During World War II, U.S. carrier-based torpedo bombers made 1,287 attacks against ships, 65% against warships, and scored hits 40% of the time.  However, the low, slow approach required for torpedo bombing made the bombers easy targets for defended ships; during the Battle of Midway, for example, virtually all of the American torpedo bombers—nearly all of the obsolete Douglas Devastator design—were shot down by the Japanese.

Korean War 

After World War II, anti-aircraft defenses were sufficiently improved to render aerial torpedo attacks suicidal. Lightweight aerial torpedoes were disposed or adapted to small attack boat usage. The only significant employment of aerial torpedoes was in anti-submarine warfare.

During the Korean War the United States Navy successfully disabled the Hwacheon Dam with aerial torpedoes launched from A-1 Skyraiders.

Modern weapons 

Since the advent of practical anti-ship missile technology, pioneered in World War II with the MCLOS-guided Fritz X as early as 1943, aerial torpedoes have largely been reduced to use in anti-submarine warfare. Missiles are generally much faster, with longer range, and without the same launch altitude limitation of aerial torpedoes. Some modern aerial anti-submarine torpedoes do have the necessary guidance capability to engage surface vessels, though given the widespread availability of missiles on aircraft and the small, specialized warhead on anti-submarine aerial torpedoes, this is not an option normally considered.

At the peak of the Falklands war, the Argentine Air Force, in collaboration with the Navy, outfitted an FMA IA 58 Pucará prototype, AX-04, with pylons to mount Mark 13 torpedoes. The aim was the possible production of Pucaras as torpedo-carrying aircraft to enhance the anti-ship capabilities of the Argentine air forces. Several trials were performed off Puerto Madryn, but the war was over before the technicians could evaluate the feasibility of the project.

As a result of the loss of the role of anti-shipping aerial torpedoes in modern naval doctrine, true torpedo bomber units no longer exist in modern armed forces. The most common platform for aerial torpedoes today is the ship-borne anti-submarine helicopter, followed by fixed-wing anti-submarine aircraft such as the American P-3 Orion.

The caveat to the above are torpedoes delivered by missiles/rocket systems, designed for anti-submarine warfare. Some designs are a straightforward mating of a rocket-propulsion system to the torpedo with a purely ballistic attack profile, such as the American ASROC. More complex, aerial drone-based system with autopilot have also been deployed, such as the Australian Ikara. Most such systems are designed to deploy from surface ships, though exceptions exist such as the Soviet navy RPK-2 Viyuga, which can be launched from both surface ships and submarines.

Given the relatively soft nature of submarines, modern anti-submarine aerial torpedoes are much smaller than anti-ship aerial torpedoes of the past, and often classified as light weight torpedoes. They are also often of cross-platform design, able to deploy from both aircraft and surface ships. Examples include the American Mark 46, Mark 50 and Mark 54 torpedoes. There are few if any aerial torpedo designs that are also used by submarines, owing to the significantly reduced capability of aerial torpedoes compared with their full-sized submarine counterparts such as the American Mark 48 torpedo.

Design 

A successful aerial launched torpedo design needs to account for:

 The distance it travels through the air before entering the water
 The heavy impact with the water

The Japanese Type 91 torpedo used Kyoban aerodynamic tail stabilizers in the air. These stabilizers (introduced in 1936) were shed off when it entered the water. And a new control system (introduced in 1941) stabilized the rolling motion by countersteering both in the air and the water.
The Type 91 torpedo could be released at speed of 180 knots (333 km/h) from 20 m (66 ft) into shallow water but also at 204 knots (the Nakajima B5N2's maximum speed) into choppy waves of a rather heavy sea.

See also 

 GT-1 (missile)
 Kettering Bug
 List of torpedoes by name

Notes

References 

 Blair, Clay. Silent Victory. Philadelphia: Lippincott, 1975.
 Campbell, N. J. M.; John Campbell. Naval Weapons of World War Two. Naval Institute Press, 1986. 
 Emmott, Norman W. "Airborne Torpedoes". United States Naval Institute Proceedings, August 1977.
 Hughes, Wayne P. Fleet Tactics and Coastal Combat, Volume 167. Naval Institute Press, 2000. 
 Milford, Frederick J. "U.S. Navy Torpedoes: Part One—Torpedoes through the Thirties". The Submarine Review, April 1996. (quarterly publication of the Naval Submarine League, P.O. Box 1146, Annandale, VA 22003)
 Milford, Frederick J. "U.S. Navy Torpedoes: Part Two—The Great Torpedo Scandal, 1941–43". The Submarine Review, October 1996.
 Milford, Frederick J. "U.S. Navy Torpedoes: Part Three—WW II development of conventional torpedoes 1940–1946". The Submarine Review, January 1997.
 Peattie, Mark R. Sunburst: The Rise of Japanese Naval Air Power, 1909–1941, Naval Institute Press, 2007. 
 Thiele, Harold. Luftwaffe aerial torpedo aircraft & operations in World War Two. Hikoki, 2005.

External links 

 

Ammunition
 
Projectiles